Adrenosterone, also known as Reichstein's substance G , as well as 11-ketoandrostenedione (11-KA4), 11-oxoandrostenedione (11-OXO), and androst-4-ene-3,11,17-trione, is a steroid hormone with an extremely weak androgenic effect, and an intermediate/prohormone of 11-ketotestosterone. It was first isolated in 1936 from the adrenal cortex by Tadeus Reichstein at the Pharmaceutical Institute in the University of Basel. Originally, adrenosterone was called Reichstein's substance G. Adrenosterone occurs in trace amounts in humans as well as most mammals and in larger amounts in fish, where it is a precursor to the primary androgen, 11-ketotestosterone.

Adrenosterone is sold as a dietary supplement since 2007 as a fat loss and muscle gaining supplement.  It is thought to be a competitive selective 11βHSD1 inhibitor, which is responsible for activation of cortisol from cortisone. Thus preventing muscle breakdown, and contributing to a majority of its effects.

See also
 11β-Hydroxyandrostenedione
 11-Ketodihydrotestosterone

References

Androgens and anabolic steroids
Androstanes
Hormones of the suprarenal cortex
Sex hormones
Steroid hormones
Triketones